Maxson is a surname. Notable people with the surname include:

Alvin Maxson (born 1951), American football player
Eileen Maxson (born 1980), American artist
Herbert B. Maxson (died 1927), American civil engineer
Louis Maxson (1855–1916), American archer
Robert Maxson, American academic
Stephen Maxson, American behavior geneticist
William Maxson (1930–2013), American Air Force officer